Scotts Flat may refer to:

Scotts Flat, California
Scotts Flat Reservoir